The Barons Of Tang is a Melbourne-based seven-piece band who mix together a large range of genres, most commonly world music. They term the resulting music "gypsy deathcore".

Their album Into the Mouths of Hungry Giants was nominated for the 2014 ARIA Award for Best World Music Album.

Members
Don Carlos Parraga – Accordion
Julian Cue – Double bass, Vocals
Sean Wyers – Drums
Annie Pfeiffer – Percussion
Aviva Endean – Bass Clarinet
Anna Joy Gordon – Saxophone
Jules Brunton – Electric Guitar

Discography

Albums

Awards and nominations

ARIA Music Awards
The ARIA Music Awards is an annual awards ceremony that recognises excellence, innovation, and achievement across all genres of Australian music. They commenced in 1987.

! 
|-
| 2014
| Into the Mouths of Hungry Giants
| ARIA Award for Best World Music Album
| 
| 
|-

References

Australian world music groups